Anjuman Talaba-e-Islam ("Islamic Organization of Students") is a student organization related to the Hanfi school of thought  made to promote Ishq e Rasool ( love of Muhammad) & to protect the rights of the students of Barelvi community. Anjuman Talaba e Islam was founded on 20 January 1968 with respect to 20th Shawwal 1387 A.H in Karachi, Pakistan by Jameel Ahmed Naeemi, Haji Hanif Tayyab along with some of their fellow students.

Political protests
Anjuman Talaba-e-Islam, in October 2001 before impending U.S. attack on Afghanistan, had taken out a protest rally against it in Khairpur, Sindh.

ATI arranged massive protests and conferences to support Kashmir's Freedom movement.

References

External links
Official App

Students' federations of Pakistan
Student religious organisations in Pakistan
Student politics in Pakistan
Social movements in Pakistan
Student organizations established in 1968
1968 establishments in Pakistan